Tucson Medical Center (TMC), licensed at 641 beds, is a locally governed nonprofit regional hospital in Tucson, Arizona. The medical center treats about 30,000 inpatients and 120,000 outpatients annually as well as around 6,000 births.

TMC holds designation as a Neuroscience Center of Excellence, certification as a Primary Stroke Center and accreditation as a Chest Pain Center. TMC is the only hospital in Southern Arizona to be chosen for the Thomson Reuters list of the 50 Top Cardiovascular Hospitals in the US for 2011. The hospital is accredited by The Joint Commission, and is also a member of the Mayo Clinic Network.

Awards and recognition 
 TMC is listed by Thomson Reuters as one of the nation's 50 Top Cardiovascular Hospitals for 2011 – the only hospital in Southern Arizona to make the list.
 TMC earned the American Heart Association/American Stroke Association's Get With The Guidelines-Stroke Gold Plus Quality Achievement Award for 2011.
 TMC's electronic medical record is one of the few to reach the top level, Stage 7, on the HIMSS Analytics Database, which tracks hospital EMRs from Stages 0–7.
 TMC is certified as a Primary Stroke Center by the Healthcare Facilities Accreditation Program (HFAP).
 TMC designated an Accredited Chest Pain Center by the Society of Chest Pain Centers.
 TMC's support of breastfeeding is recognized with the IBCLC Care Award from the International Lactation Consultant Association.
 TMC is one of the top-ranked hospitals in Tucson named by U.S. News & World Report in its Best Hospitals Metro Area Rankings.
 TMC for Children is an associate member of the National Association of Children's Hospital and Related Institutions.
 TMC Neurosciences holds NeuStrategy designation as a Neuroscience Center of Excellence.
 TMC has been chosen by Dartmouth College and the Brookings Institution for a national Accountable Care Organization pilot project.

References

External links 
 

Hospital buildings completed in 1944
Buildings and structures in Tucson, Arizona
Hospitals established in 1944
Hospitals in Arizona